The Karabastau Formation is a geological formation and lagerstätte in the Karatau Mountains of southern Kazakhstan whose strata date to the Middle to Late Jurassic. It is an important locality for insect fossils that has been studied since the early 20th century, alongside the rarer remains of vertebrates, including pterosaurs, salamanders, lizards and crocodiles.

Lithology and depositional environment 
The primary lithology consists of 1 mm thick varve laminations of claystone, with a dark part and a light dolomitic part, which probably correspond to a wet and dry season respectively, alongside rare, several cm thick sandstone interbeds. These were deposited within an ancient freshwater paleolake, that given the number of laminations has been suggested to have existed for over 150,000 years. The top of the formation shows the laminations becoming wavy, likely as a result of microbial interactions, and the top of the formation is capped by a conglomerate predominantly composed of black Carboniferous limestone pebbles.

History of discovery 
The Karabastau Formation was first discovered in 1921 by Soviet geologists, and was declared a protected paleontological reserve in 1924.

Paleofauna

Vertebrates

Invertebrates
Hundreds of species of insects are known from several localities within the formation, primarily Karatau-Mikhailovka

Flora

See also 
 List of pterosaur-bearing stratigraphic units
 List of fossiliferous stratigraphic units in Kazakhstan

References 

Geologic formations of Kazakhstan
Jurassic System of Asia
Jurassic Kazakhstan
Kimmeridgian Stage
Oxfordian Stage
Shale formations
Dolomite formations
Lacustrine deposits
Lagerstätten
Fossiliferous stratigraphic units of Asia
Paleontology in Kazakhstan